John Albrechtson (22 July 1936 – 27 August 1985) was a Swedish sailor. Between 1968 and 1978 he won one Olympic gold medal and three gold, one silver and one bronze medals at the world championships.

Biography
Albrechtson started his sailing career in the Stjärnbåt class and moved on to Star class in 1957. He won his first Star Swedish Championships in 1966. The same year, together with Paul Elvstrøm, he won the Star World Championships.

Between 1971 and 1978 Albrechtson competed in the Tempest class. At the 1976 Summer Olympics he won the Olympic gold medal together with Ingvar Hansson. He also competed at the 1968 and 1972 Summer Olympics, placing ninth and fourth, respectively. At the 1980 Games he was part of Swedish reserve team.

Albrechtson committed suicide in Västra Frölunda aged 49.

References

1936 births
1985 suicides
Sportspeople from Gothenburg
Swedish male sailors (sport)
Olympic sailors of Sweden
Sailors at the 1968 Summer Olympics – Star
Sailors at the 1972 Summer Olympics – Tempest
Sailors at the 1976 Summer Olympics – Tempest
Olympic gold medalists for Sweden
Olympic medalists in sailing
Star class world champions
Royal Gothenburg Yacht Club sailors

Medalists at the 1976 Summer Olympics
World champions in sailing for Sweden
Suicides in Sweden